Stéphane A. Yelle (born May 9, 1974) is a Canadian former professional ice hockey centre who played in the National Hockey League with the Colorado Avalanche, Calgary Flames, Boston Bruins and the Carolina Hurricanes.

He is a two-time Stanley Cup champion, having won with Colorado in 1996 and 2001.

Playing career
Yelle played with the Oshawa Generals in the Ontario Hockey League when he was drafted in the 8th round (186th overall) in the 1992 NHL Entry Draft by the New Jersey Devils. On June 1, 1994, he was traded to the Quebec Nordiques, and made his professional debut in the 1994–95 season with AHL affiliate, the Cornwall Aces.

The following season, Yelle's rights were transferred as the Nordiques relocated to Denver to become the Colorado Avalanche. In 1995–96, his and the Avalanche's first season in the NHL, Yelle became a regular as he played in 71 games en route to the Stanley Cup Championship. Known as an excellent faceoff taker and a gritty, hard-working player, Yelle played seven seasons for the Avalanche from 1995 to 2002, capturing another Stanley Cup in the 2000–01 season.

On October 1, 2002, prior to the 2002–03 season, Stéphane was traded by the Avalanche, along with Chris Drury, to the Calgary Flames for Derek Morris, Dean McAmmond and Jeff Shantz. Yelle's transition was seamless as he established himself on the Flames checking line, helping Calgary to a 2004 Stanley Cup final appearance after a seven-year playoff hiatus. Throughout his five seasons with the Flames, Yelle's versatility and defensive prowess was often highlighted as he would often fill-in as a defenseman when others were out injured.

On September 3, 2007, Yelle was signed to a two-year deal with the Boston Bruins. In 2007–08, the veteran played in 51 games scoring 12 points with the Eastern Conference leading Bruins.

On August 19, 2009, he signed a one-year contract with the Carolina Hurricanes. After a slow start to the 2009–10 season, the struggling Hurricanes placed Yelle on waivers on October 26, 2009. He went unclaimed and progressively found his feet, staying on the roster.

On March 3, 2010, Yelle was traded by the Hurricanes, along with Harrison Reed, back to the Colorado Avalanche for Cedric Lalonde-McNicoll and a sixth-round draft pick.  He has since retired and taken a development coordinator position with the Avalanche.

Career statistics

Awards and honours

References

External links
 
 NHLPA biography

1974 births
Boston Bruins players
Calgary Flames players
Canadian ice hockey centres
Carolina Hurricanes players
Colorado Avalanche coaches
Colorado Avalanche players
Franco-Ontarian people
Living people
New Jersey Devils draft picks
Oshawa Generals players
People from Clarence-Rockland
Stanley Cup champions
Canadian ice hockey coaches